Sugar House, Sugarhouse, and other variants of that phrase may refer to: 

A sugar shack, a cabin used to boil sap from sugar maple trees into maple syrup
Sugar House, Salt Lake City, a neighborhood in Salt Lake City, Utah
Sugar House Park, a park in the Sugar House neighborhood of Salt Lake City
Sugar House Prison (Utah), a prison in the Sugar House neighborhood of Salt Lake City
S Line (Utah Transit Authority), formerly known as Sugar House Streetcar
Rivers Casino Philadelphia, formerly known as SugarHouse Casino
Sugarhouse (film), a 2007 British thriller
Sugar house prisons in New York City, facilities for holding British prisoners of war during the American Revolution

See also
Sugar Shack (disambiguation)
House of Sugar, 2019 album by (Sandy) Alex G
The Purple Gang, also known as The Sugar House Gang, Prohibition-era criminal organization in Detroit